The Rashad languages form a small language family in the Nuba Hills of Sudan. They are named after Rashad District of South Kordofan.

Classification
Part of an erstwhile Kordofanian proposal, they are of uncertain position within the Niger–Congo family. It was at first thought that they shared the characteristic morphology of Niger–Congo, such as the noun-class system. However, only the Tagoi branch has noun classes, and Blench remarks that it appears to have been borrowed. Thus, he classifies Rashad as a divergent branch of Niger–Congo outside the Atlantic–Congo core. A similar situation holds for another Kordofanian family, Katla; these are not closely related to Rashad.

Unlike the neighbouring Talodi-Heiban languages which have SVO word order, Rashad languages (and also Lafofa) have SOV word order.

Languages
The number of Rashad languages varies among descriptions, from two (Williamson & Blench 2000, reflected in the ISO codes) to seven (Blench ms, shown here).

Tagoi
Goy (Tagoi)
Umali (Tumale)
Moreb
Orig (Turjuk)
Tegali
Tegali (Tingal, Kajakja)
Gom (Rashad)

See also
Rashad word lists (Wiktionary)

Further reading
Schadeberg, Thilo. 2013. Rashad survey data. In Roger Blench & Thilo Schadeberg (eds), Nuba Mountain Language Studies. Cologne: Rüdiger Köppe. pp. 325–345.

References

 Roger Blench.  Unpublished. Kordofanian and Niger–Congo: new and revised lexical evidence.
 Roger Blench, 2011, Should Kordofanian be split up?, Nuba Hills Conference, Leiden

 
Kordofanian languages
Language families